Karel Tilga (born 5 February 1998) is an Estonian athlete who competes in the decathlon.

From Tartu, and a student at the University of Georgia. In 2021 he won for Georgia Bulldogs (men) their fifth ever NCAA individual title (second in the heptathlon) by scoring a school record 6,264 to win the heptathlon at the NCAA Championships with the No. 2 all-time collegiate performance. He scored a near 400 point-improvement on his decathlon lifetime best at the Specs Town Invitational in Athens, Georgia in April 2021 besting Garrett Scantling by just 8 points. Tilga's score reached the Olympic qualifying standard of 8350 points for the delayed 2020 Tokyo Olympics. At the Olympics he received 0 in pole vault and eventually finished 20th. He did not finish the 2022 European Championships after also receiving 0 in pole vault.

He is the 2021 NCAA champion in decathlon.

Tilga finished 9th at the 2022 World Indoor Championships.

References

External links
 
  (Track & Field Results Reporting System)
 
 

1998 births
Living people
Estonian decathletes
Georgia Bulldogs track and field athletes
Sportspeople from Tartu
Estonian expatriate sportspeople in the United States
Olympic athletes of Estonia
Athletes (track and field) at the 2020 Summer Olympics